The KCB Karen Masters is a golf tournament on the Sunshine Tour.

It was first played on 18 and 19 March 2017 as a 36-hole event. It was won by Wil Besseling who won the first prize of US$4,000. In 2018 it became a Sunshine Tour event. It is held at Karen Country Club, south-west of Nairobi, Kenya. It is sponsored by Kenya Commercial Bank.

Winners

Notes

References

External links

Karen Country Club
Sunshine Tour's official site

Sunshine Tour events
Golf tournaments in Kenya
Recurring sporting events established in 2017
2017 establishments in Kenya